Houten Castellum is a railway station located in Houten, Netherlands, which opened at 8 January 2001 and it is located on the Utrecht–Boxtel railway . Originally it was the southernmost point of the Houten - Houten Castellum tram line. This temporary service closed at 14 December 2008. The services are operated by Nederlandse Spoorwegen. During this time the service was operated by a tram from Hannover on loan to Nederlandse Spoorwegen, operated by HTM. After closure of the tram line due to construction of a new station and expanding of the railway to 4 tracks, the tram service was replaced by a bus service. The new station opened at 12 December 2010 and bus service ceased. All local trains call at Houten Castellum at the center platform along the inner tracks, while Intercity services and cargo trains use the outer tracks.

Train services

Bus services

Gallery

External links
NS website 
Dutch Public Transport journey planner 

Railway stations in Utrecht (province)
Railway stations on the Staatslijn H
Railway stations opened in 2001
Railway stations closed in 2008
Railway stations opened in 2010
Houten